The Women's 1500 Freestyle event at the 11th FINA World Aquatics Championships was swum on 25 – 26 July 2005 in Montreal, Quebec, Canada. Preliminary heats were swum during the morning session on 25 July with the top-8 finishers advancing to swim again in the event's final heat during the evening session on 26 July.

At the start of the event, the existing World (WR) and Championships (CR) records were:
WR: 15:52.10, Janet Evans (USA), swum 26 March 1988 in Orlando, USA;
CR: 16:00.18, Hannah Stockbauer (Germany), swum 22 July 2003 in Barcelona, Spain

Results

Preliminary heats

Final heat

References

World Aquatics Championships
Swimming at the 2005 World Aquatics Championships
World Aquatics Championships 1500 metre freestyle